This is a list of Taça da Liga winning football managers. 

Taça da Liga was established in the 2007–08 season. Carlos Carvalhal won the first edition with Vitória de Setúbal.

Quique Flores was the first foreign manager to win the competition. With the victory in 2018, Jorge Jesus became the first manager to win the tournament with two clubs, a feat later achieved by Rúben Amorim (in consecutive seasons). Amorim was also the first to win the tournament both as a player and as a manager.

Winning managers

Managers with multiple titles

By nationality

See also 
 List of Taça de Portugal winning managers
 List of Supertaça Cândido de Oliveira winning managers

References

Taça da Liga